Paul Mayersberg (born 18 June 1941) is an English writer and director and was the film critic for Movie magazine in the early 1960s and author of 1968 film book Hollywood, The Haunted House.

Awards
He received a nomination for Best Motion Picture in 2001 at the Edgar Awards for Croupier.

Filmography

Director

External links

Paul Mayersberg at ovguide
Paul Mayerberg at uk.movies.com

1941 births
People from Cambridge
British cinematographers
English male screenwriters
Living people
People from Hitchin